Pseudoceneus is a genus of beetles in the family Carabidae, containing the following species:

 Pseudoceneus beatricis Giachino, 2005
 Pseudoceneus norfolkensis Moore, 1985
 Pseudoceneus numeensis Fauvel, 1903
 Pseudoceneus sollicitus (Erichson, 1842)

References

Pterostichinae